Gobio artvinicus is a species of gudgeon, a small freshwater in the family Cyprinidae. It is found in Aralik and Çifteköpru Rivers in the Black Sea basin in Turkey.

References

 

Gobio
Fish described in 2016
Fish of Turkey